Cardea is the codename for portable version of Windows Media DRM for network devices, the marketing name of which is Windows Media DRM for Network Devices (or in short form WMDRM-ND) introduced by Microsoft. It is used for streaming protected digital media across a network for immediate playback.  

Janus (DRM) is a similar system for portable devices, but is used for synchronization.

Digital rights management systems
Microsoft Windows multimedia technology